Naomi Ceder is an American software developer, author, and conference speaker. She is the author of the second and third editions of The Quick Python Book, and was the Chairperson of the Python Software Foundation from 2017 until 2020. Naomi is a self-described intersectional transfeminist, and often speaks about inclusion and diversity in technology.

References

American software engineers
Python (programming language) people
Living people
Year of birth missing (living people)